Samuel Walsall,  D.D. (1575-1626) was a priest and academic in the late sixteenth and the early seventeenth centuries.

Walsall was born in Eastling. He was educated at Corpus Christi College, Cambridge, graduating B.A. in 1593; M.A. in 1596; and B.D. in 1604. He was appointed Fellow in 1596; and Master in 1618.  He held livings at Alkham, Appledore, St Mary Abchurch in the city of London and Little Wilbraham. He died on 31 July 1626.

References 

Alumni of Corpus Christi College, Cambridge
Fellows of Corpus Christi College, Cambridge
Masters of Corpus Christi College, Cambridge
1626 deaths
1575 births
People from the Borough of Swale